Ciurgău may refer to several places in Romania:

 Ciurgău, a village in Ceanu Mare Commune, Cluj County
 Ciurgău, a village in Luduș town, Mureș County